Amaniganj is a neighbourhood in Lucknow's Ganesh Ganj ward. There is an Indian post office Bakshi Ka Talab of Lucknow district Amaniganj, Uttar Pradesh 226203.

References 

Neighbourhoods in Lucknow